Mark Ian Addy (born 14 January 1965) is an English actor. His roles in British television include Detective Constable Gary Boyle in the sitcom The Thin Blue Line (1995–1996) and Hercules in the fantasy drama series Atlantis (2013–2015).

He made his film debut as Dave Horsefall in The Full Monty (1997), earning a nomination for the BAFTA Award for Best Actor in a Supporting Role. Other notable roles include Fred Flintstone in The Flintstones in Viva Rock Vegas (2000), Bill Miller in the CBS sitcom Still Standing (2002–2006) and King Robert Baratheon in the HBO fantasy series Game of Thrones (2011).

Early life
Addy was born 14 January 1965 in York, where his family has lived since at least 1910 when his paternal great-grandfather was recorded there. His father, Ian, spent his working life as a glazier at York Minster. Addy was educated at Joseph Rowntree School in York. Addy furthered his acting education by attending the Royal Academy of Dramatic Art in London, graduating with an Acting Diploma in 1984. Whilst still at school, Addy had 3 weeks work experience at the York Theatre Royal, loved it so much he continued working there, eventually deciding acting was to be his career goal.

Career
Addy made his first television appearance in 1987 in The Ritz, followed in 1988 by A Very Peculiar Practice, followed by television performances in shows such as Heartbeat, Band of Gold, Married... with Children, Peak Practice, Too Much Sun, Sunnyside Farm, Trollied and The Syndicate.

He portrayed Bill Miller (using an improvised American accent) in Still Standing and portrayed Detective Boyle in the second series of the British sitcom The Thin Blue Line. He also appeared on ITV1's comedy drama series Bonkers, and another ITV comedy drama, Bike Squad, in early 2008 as Sergeant John Rook.

In 2009, Addy starred with Fay Ripley in a series of adverts for the relaunched Tesco Clubcard. 

In 2011, He portrayed King Robert Baratheon in the HBO series Game of Thrones: Addy's audition for the role was, according to showrunners David Benioff and D. B. Weiss, the best they saw, he being the easiest actor to cast for the show. Although Robert was a main character in the series beginning, the king's enthusiasm for drinking, whoring, and hunting, eventually took its toll, and Addy's character was killed off in season 1 after a hunting incident with a wild boar.

He portrayed Hercules, one of the main characters in the BBC One fantasy drama series Atlantis, which started airing on 28 September 2013 in the UK. In the BBC television drama New Blood (2016), featuring young detectives from the Serious Fraud Office and the London Police Service, Addy played D.S. Derek Sands.

In film, Addy had a leading role in The Full Monty (1997), and portrayed Fred Flintstone in the 2000 film The Flintstones in Viva Rock Vegas. He portrayed Mac McArthur in the 1998 film Jack Frost. In 2001, he portrayed Roland in A Knight's Tale and a butler to Chris Rock's character in the film Down to Earth. In Down to Earth, his character was an American who was pretending to be British.

Addy portrayed David Philby in The Time Machine and made an appearance as the Ship Captain in Around the World in 80 Days with Jackie Chan and Steve Coogan, and made an appearance as Friar Tuck in Ridley Scott's 2010 film Robin Hood.

In 2018, he portrayed Paltraki in the Doctor Who episode "The Battle of Ranskoor Av Kolos".

In 2019, he appeared in the Downton Abbey movie as Mr. Bakewell, who owns the shop from which Mrs. Patmore buys her supplies; a character who was mentioned in the television series but hadn't yet appeared onscreen.

In 2020, he portrayed DS Stan Jones in the detective drama series White House Farm.

In 2023, Addy starred as David Coake, causing issues on the Kinloch Bravo oil rig in The Rig, in a cast that included Iain Glen, Emily Hampshire, and Martin Compston.

Stage
Addy portrayed Kevin Snell in the 2006 revival of Donkeys' Years at the Comedy Theatre in London.
In 2007–08 he has appeared at the National Theatre as Dogberry in Much Ado About Nothing alongside Zoe Wanamaker, and as Hjalmar Johansen in the Tony Harrison play Fram, also at the Royal National Theatre.

In 2011, he portrayed Vladimir, an NKVD officer, in Collaborators at the National Theatre, which also featured in the National Theatre Live programme, where live performances are broadcast to cinemas around the world. In 2016, Addy appeared in Richard Bean's The Nap at Sheffield Crucible with Jack O'Connell and Ralf Little, directed by Richard Wilson.

Honours
On 20 July 2019, Addy was awarded an honorary doctorate from the University of York, having given a speech at the Roses Varsity opening ceremony a few months prior.

Filmography

Film

Television

Other appearances

Theatre

Video games

Awards and nominations

References

External links
Mark Addy at the British Film Institute

Living people
20th-century English male actors
21st-century English male actors
Alumni of RADA
English male film actors
English male television actors
English male Shakespearean actors
English male stage actors
English male voice actors
Outstanding Performance by a Cast in a Motion Picture Screen Actors Guild Award winners
Male actors from York
1964 births